PDFtk (short for PDF Toolkit) is a toolkit for manipulating Portable Document Format (PDF) documents. It runs on Linux, Windows and MacOS. It comes in three versions: PDFtk Server (open-source command-line tool), PDFtk Free (freeware) and PDFtk Pro (proprietary paid). It is able to concatenate, shuffle, split and rotate PDF files. It can also show and update metadata. Both CLI and GUI versions of PDFTK are available.

Java implementation 
pdftk-java is a port of PDFtk into Java which is developed by Marc Vinyals and GPL licensed. The initial release was on December 30, 2017.

See also
List of PDF software

References

External links

PDF Chain, a GUI for Linux (GPL)
An older GUI, working under Windows and most Linux distributions (GPL)
PDFTK4ALL, a GUI for Windows (GPL), last release 0.2.1.0 beta from February 25, 2009 including a copy of PDFTK 1.41
PDFTK Builder, a GUI for Windows (GPL), last release 3.10.0 from July 13, 2018

Free PDF software
Free software programmed in Java (programming language)